Bocas del Toro (meaning "Mouths of the Bull") is a province of Panama. Its area is 4,643.9 square kilometers, comprising the mainland and nine main islands. The province consists of the Bocas del Toro Archipelago, Bahía Almirante (Almirante Bay), Chiriquí Lagoon, and adjacent mainland. The capital is the city of Bocas del Toro (or Bocas Town) on Isla Colón (Colón Island). Other major cities or towns include Almirante and  Changuinola. The province has a population of 125,461 as of 2010.

Christopher Columbus and his crew first visited the area in 1502. Bocas del Toro borders the Caribbean Sea to the north, Limón Province of Costa Rica to the west, Chiriquí Province to the south, and Ngöbe-Buglé Comarca to the east. The Río Sixaola forms part of the border with Costa Rica. An old railroad bridge spans the river between Guabito and Sixaola, Costa Rica. The bridge is a border crossing used by tourists going between destinations in Bocas del Toro and Costa Rica.

The province contains two national parks, Isla Bastimentos National Marine Park and La Amistad International Park. The Smithsonian Tropical Research Institute operates a research station on Colón Island just northwest of Bocas Town. There are many banana plantations in Bocas del Toro, often called the oro verde, or green gold of Central America.

History 

Christopher Columbus explored the area in 1502 while searching for the passage to the Pacific Ocean. Columbus's original name for the island was Isla del Drago. In colonial times, Bocas del Toro was part of Veraguas. It was originally part of Costa Rica until, in one of many territorial disputes, Colombia took control of it with armed forces. The then government made a reservation called Bocas del Toro in 1834. In 1850, Bocas del Toro became a part of Chiriqui, then was separated from it and became part of Colon. On November 16, 1903, Bocas del Toro was separated from Colon and became its own province. In 1941, Bocas del Toro was divided into two districts, Bocas del Toro and Crimamola. Four years later, it became part of the same division as before. In 1970, Bocas del Toro district became Changuinola, the district of Bastimentos was eliminated, and three new districts were added, making the province what it is today. The districts' areas changed in 1997 when the Ngöbe-Buglé Comarca was created.

The province is the home of the unique Bocas del Toro Creole of English.

Administrative divisions 
Bocas del Toro Province is divided into 4 districts and 30 corregimientos. On 8 June 2015 the new Almirante District was created, after splitting out from Changuinola District.

* The area of Almirante District is included in the figure quoted for Changuinola District, from which Almirante was divided.

Geography

Climate 
Bocas del Toro is a travel destination that is most known for its vibrant culture, beaches, rainforests, and surfing. It is estimated that 95% of the economy in Bocas del Toro is based on tourism. The most popular destinations in Bocas del Toro are the Zapatilla Islands, the Bastimentos National Marine Park, Starfish Beach, Red Frog Beach, Bluff Beach, and Hospital Point.

The High-Season for tourism in Bocas del Toro is from November to April, which also coincides with the dry season as well as the being the best surf season. The best months to visit Bocas del Toro for dry weather are January, February, March, May, September, and October. These are statistically the driest months of the year. However, dry weather is also common in June, August, November, and even the wettest month of the year, December, can see weeks without rain.

Bocas del Toro is not a typical Caribbean tourist destination such as Cancún or the US Virgin Islands. It is very much still a 3rd world destination that is embracing development at a typically slow and laid back pace. There are no large hotels lining the beaches or big resorts covering the islands. Instead, there are small, boutique accommodations.

Common activities in Bocas del Toro include Surfing, Scuba Diving, exploring Bat Caves, learning about the local indigenous cultures, Cacao Farm tours, hiking, and nightlife.

Protected areas 
The national parks in the province are Isla Bastimentos National Marine Park (Parque Nacional Marino Isla Bastimentos), which contains most of Isla Bastimentos and some smaller nearby islands and extends into the large nature preserve at the Red Frog Beach Island Resort, and La Amistad International Park (Parque Internacional La Amistad), which spans the Costa Rica–Panama border. La Amistad International Park is a designated UNESCO World Heritage site.

Gallery

References 

10. www.bocasdeltoro.com Official Web Site of the Island
11. ^ http://bocasdeltoro.travel/ Official Bocas del Toro Travel Website

External links 
Paraiso for Sale 2011 documentary about US immigration to Bocas, and the attendant impact on locals and indigenous peoples

 
Provinces of Panama
States and territories established in 1903